Sonma is a big village at Garhpura block, in Begusarai district. It is also written somewhere as "Sonwan". Its neighbours are Mauji Harisingh, Kumharson and Bagmati river. Population of the village is around 15,000. It is the second largest village in Garhpura block. Presently Mukhiya of this village is Mr. Shivnarayan Ram.

A road passes through the village which connects Bakhri and Garhpura. Dasin Lake is famous for its fisheries in the region.

References

Villages in Begusarai district
Durga Temple an Hanuman mandir in Western portion of village